Edward Benson Herman (born October 2, 1980) is an American professional mixed martial artist currently competing in the Light Heavyweight division of the Ultimate Fighting Championship. A professional competitor since 2002, Herman was a finalist on SpikeTV's The Ultimate Fighter 3, and has also competed for Strikeforce and Pancrase.

Herman currently has the longest uninterrupted tenure on the active roster in the UFC (made promotional debut on June 24, 2006).

Background
Herman was born and primarily raised in Vancouver, Washington by his father who competed in wrestling for The University of Iowa. Herman attended Columbia River High School where he competed in wrestling and football during his junior and senior years. Shortly after high school Herman began training in mixed martial arts at Team Quest.

Mixed martial arts career

SportFight
After compiling a 4-1 record under the SportFight banner, a 24 year old Ed Herman would capture the light heavyweight championship against eventual UFC light heavyweight champion Glover Teixeira at SF 9: Respect. After the bout Glover would go on a 20 fight, 9 year unbeaten streak. Herman would never defend the belt, and shortly after would be selected to be a participant on SpikeTV's The Ultimate Fighter.

The Ultimate Fighter
While on The Ultimate Fighter, he won a preliminary victory against Danny Abaddi via armbar submission. In the semifinals, he defeated Rory Singer via rear-naked choke submission. He then lost to Kendall Grove in the finals by unanimous decision. Despite his loss, Herman was subsequently awarded a contract by UFC president Dana White based on his performance.

Ultimate Fighting Championship
Herman made his UFC debut at The Ultimate Fighter 3 Finale, where he lost to Kendall Grove in the finals by unanimous decision.

Herman lost his second fight to Jason MacDonald at Ortiz vs. Shamrock 3: The Final Chapter via triangle choke submission in round one.

At UFC Fight Night: Evans vs Salmon, Herman scored his first UFC victory in a Catchweight contest defeating Chris Price via armbar midway through round one. At the weigh in Herman made the 186 lb limit however Price did not take to the scales, coming back later that evening to record 192 lb.

Herman won his second consecutive UFC fight by defeating Scott Smith via rear-naked choke submission. This fight was held at UFC 72 in Belfast, Northern Ireland. Herman won Submission of the Night honors for his performance.

In Herman's fourth UFC fight, he took on Canadian fighter Joe Doerksen at UFC 78 who held a prior victory over Herman via submission. Herman avenged that loss, winning the fight by knocking Doerksen out in the third round and receiving Knockout of the Night honors in the process.

At UFC 83, Herman took on undefeated Brazilian fighter Demian Maia. Herman lost to Maia by triangle choke submission in the second round.

At UFC Fight Night: Diaz vs. Neer, Herman lost by split decision to Alan Belcher.

Herman's next fight came at UFC 97, where he defeated David Loiseau via unanimous decision.

In his fight against Aaron Simpson, Herman's knee was caught in a bad position near the end of the first-round during a takedown, with his opponent landing on the knee. Herman most likely sustained a serious injury at this point, visibly having trouble putting any weight on the injured leg after the round ended. Herman seemed to recover, and answered the bell for the second round. Early in the second, however, Herman further injured his knee attempting a high-kick, causing him to collapse to the mat in pain and the fight to be stopped.

Herman faced Tim Credeur on June 4, 2011 at The Ultimate Fighter 13 Finale, winning via TKO 48 seconds into the first round.

Herman then stepped in to replace an injured Tom Lawlor against Kyle Noke at UFC on Versus 5 on August 14, 2011. Herman defeated Noke by submission (heel hook) in the first round.

Herman faced Clifford Starks on February 4, 2012 at UFC 143. He won the fight via submission in the second round.

Herman faced Jake Shields on August 11, 2012 at UFC 150. Herman lost to Shields via unanimous decision. However, on October 12, 2012, it was revealed that Shields has tested positive for a banned substance and the result was overturned to a No Contest.

For the Strikeforce promotion's final show, Herman was allowed to step away from the UFC for one fight and signed to face Ronaldo Souza at Strikeforce: Marquardt vs. Saffiedine on January 12, 2013. Herman took the fight after several UFC fighters turned it down. He lost the fight via submission in the first round.

Herman faced Trevor Smith on July 27, 2013 at UFC on Fox 8. He won the fight by split decision. The win also earned Herman his second Fight of the Night bonus award.

Herman was expected to face Rafael Natal on November 16, 2013 at UFC 167.  However, Natal was pulled from the pairing with Herman in favor of a bout with Tim Kennedy on November 6, 2013 in the event headliner at UFC Fight Night 31.  Herman instead faced Thales Leites. He lost the fight via unanimous decision.

Herman faced Rafael Natal on May 10, 2014 at UFC Fight Night 40. He won the fight via unanimous decision.

Herman was expected to face Derek Brunson on December 13, 2014 at UFC on Fox 13.  However, the fight was scrapped just hours before the fight, as Brunson was stricken with a stomach ailment.  Subsequently, the bout with Brunson was rescheduled and took place on January 31, 2015 at UFC 183. Herman lost the fight via TKO in the first round.

Herman faced Tim Boetsch in a light heavyweight bout on January 17, 2016 at UFC Fight Night: Dillashaw vs. Cruz. He won the fight via TKO in the second round and earned a Performance of the Night bonus.

Herman faced Nikita Krylov on July 30, 2016 at UFC 201. He lost the fight via knockout due to a head kick in the second round.

Herman was expected to face Igor Pokrajac on March 4, 2017 at UFC 209. However, Pokrajac pulled out of the fight in early February citing an injury, and was replaced by Gadzhimurad Antigulov. Subsequently, on February 20, Herman revealed that he was injured and would be unable to compete at the event.

Herman faced C. B. Dollaway on July 7, 2017 at The Ultimate Fighter 25 Finale. He lost the back-and-forth bout via unanimous decision.

Herman faced Gian Villante on October 27, 2018 at UFC Fight Night 138. He lost the back-and-forth fight via split decision.

Herman faced Patrick Cummins on May 18, 2019 at UFC Fight Night 152. He won the fight via TKO in the first round.

Marking the first fight of his new four-fight contract with the UFC, Herman was expected to face Gadzhimurad Antigulov on November 9, 2019 at UFC Fight Night 163. However, on October 29, 2019 it was reported that Antigulov was pulled from the bout for undisclosed reason and he was replaced by Khadis Ibragimov. He won the fight via unanimous decision.

Herman was scheduled to face Da Un Jung on May 2, 2020 at UFC Fight Night: Hermansson vs. Weidman. However, on April 9, Dana White, the president of UFC announced that the event was postponed to a future date. The bout with Jung was expected to take place on August 1, 2020 at UFC Fight Night: Brunson vs. Shahbazyan. However, Jung was removed from the bout on July 23 due to alleged travel restrictions related to the COVID-19 pandemic. In turn, Herman was rebooked to face Gerald Meerschaert at the event. On the day of the event, Meerschaert was pulled out due to testing positive for COVID-19 and the bout was cancelled. It was rescheduled for September 12, 2020 at UFC Fight Night 177. However, Meerschaert withdrew from the bout again for undisclosed reasons and he was briefly replaced by John Allan. In turn, Allan was removed from the fight in early September as he faced travel restrictions related to the COVID-19 pandemic and was replaced by Mike Rodríguez. During the second round Rodríguez dropped Herman with a knee to the body that was called as an illegal low blow by the referee. However, further replay showed it was a legal strike to the midsection. Herman was given extra time to recover, and went on to win the fight via kimura submission in round three.

Herman was scheduled to face Danilo Marques on June 26, 2021 at UFC Fight Night 190.  However, Herman was removed from the card due to undisclosed reasons on June 14 and replaced by Kennedy Nzechukwu.

Herman faced Alonzo Menifield on August 7, 2021 at UFC 265. He lost the fight via unanimous decision.

Herman was expected to face Maxim Grishin on February 12, 2022 at UFC 271. However, Herman pulled out of the bout and was replaced by William Knight.

Herman is scheduled to face  Zak Cummings on April 15, 2023, at UFC on ESPN 44.

Personal life
Herman lives with his girlfriend Crystal and her daughter. The couple had twins in January 2008. Before becoming a full-time professional fighter, Herman worked as a bartender and bouncer. He also has a younger brother and two step-sisters. In September 2017, Herman lost the tip of the index finger on his left hand as a result of a DIY plumbing accident at his home.

Championships and accomplishments
Ultimate Fighting Championship
The Ultimate Fighter 3 Middleweight Runner up
Fight of the Night (Two times) vs. Kendall Grove, Trevor Smith 
Knockout of the Night (One time) vs. Joe Doerksen 
Submission of the Night (Two times) vs. Chris Price, Scott Smith 
Performance of the Night (One time) vs. Tim Boetsch 
SportFight
SportFight Light Heavyweight Championship (One time)

Mixed martial arts record 

|-
|Loss
|align=center|26–15 (1)
|Alonzo Menifield
|Decision (unanimous)
|UFC 265
|
|align=center|3
|align=center|5:00
|Houston, Texas, United States
|
|-
|Win
|align=center|26–14 (1)
|Mike Rodríguez
|Submission (kimura)
|UFC Fight Night: Waterson vs. Hill
|
|align=center|3
|align=center|4:01
|Las Vegas, Nevada, United States
|
|-
|Win
|align=center|25–14 (1)
|Khadis Ibragimov
|Decision (unanimous)
|UFC Fight Night: Magomedsharipov vs. Kattar 
|
|align=center|3
|align=center|5:00
|Moscow, Russia
|
|-
|Win
|align=center|24–14 (1)
|Patrick Cummins
|TKO (knee and punches)
|UFC Fight Night: dos Anjos vs. Lee 
|
|align=center|1
|align=center|3:39
|Rochester, New York, United States
|
|-
|Loss
|align=center|23–14 (1)
|Gian Villante
|Decision (split)
|UFC Fight Night: Volkan vs. Smith 
|
|align=center|3
|align=center|5:00
|Moncton, New Brunswick, Canada
| 
|-
|Loss
|align=center|23–13 (1)
|C. B. Dollaway
|Decision (unanimous)
|The Ultimate Fighter: Redemption Finale
|
|align=center|3
|align=center|5:00
|Las Vegas, Nevada, United States
|
|-
|Loss
|align=center|23–12 (1)
|Nikita Krylov
|KO (head kick)
|UFC 201 
|
|align=center|2
|align=center|0:40
|Atlanta, Georgia, United States
|
|-
|Win
|align=center|23–11 (1)
|Tim Boetsch
|TKO (knee and punches)
|UFC Fight Night: Dillashaw vs. Cruz
|
|align=center|2
|align=center|1:39
|Boston, Massachusetts, United States
|      
|-
| Loss
| align=center| 22–11 (1)
| Derek Brunson
| TKO (punches)
| UFC 183
| 
| align=center| 1 
| align=center| 0:36
| Las Vegas, Nevada, United States
| 
|-
| Win
| align=center| 22–10 (1)
| Rafael Natal
| Decision (unanimous)
| UFC Fight Night: Brown vs. Silva
| 
| align=center| 3
| align=center| 5:00
| Cincinnati, Ohio, United States
| 
|-
| Loss
| align=center| 21–10 (1)
| Thales Leites
| Decision (unanimous)
| UFC 167
| 
| align=center| 3
| align=center| 5:00
| Las Vegas, Nevada, United States
| 
|-
| Win
| align=center| 21–9 (1)
| Trevor Smith
| Decision (split)
| UFC on Fox: Johnson vs. Moraga
| 
| align=center| 3 
| align=center| 5:00 
| Seattle, Washington, United States
| 
|-
| Loss
| align=center| 20–9 (1)
| Ronaldo Souza
| Submission (kimura)
| Strikeforce: Marquardt vs. Saffiedine
| 
| align=center| 1
| align=center| 3:10
| Oklahoma City, Oklahoma, United States
|
|-
| NC
| align=center| 20–8 (1)
| Jake Shields
| NC (overturned)
| UFC 150
| 
| align=center| 3
| align=center| 5:00
| Denver, Colorado, United States
| 
|-
| Win
| align=center| 20–8
| Clifford Starks
| Submission (rear-naked choke)
| UFC 143
| 
| align=center| 2
| align=center| 1:43
| Las Vegas, Nevada, United States
| 
|-
| Win
| align=center| 19–8
| Kyle Noke
| Submission (inverted heel hook)
| UFC Live: Hardy vs. Lytle
| 
| align=center| 1
| align=center| 4:15
| Milwaukee, Wisconsin, United States
| 
|-
| Win
| align=center| 18–8
| Tim Credeur
| TKO (punches)
| The Ultimate Fighter: Team Lesnar vs. Team dos Santos Finale
| 
| align=center| 1
| align=center| 0:48
| Las Vegas, Nevada, United States
| 
|-
| Loss
| align=center| 17–8
| Aaron Simpson
| TKO (knee injury)
| UFC 102
| 
| align=center| 2
| align=center| 0:17
| Portland, Oregon, United States
| 
|-
| Win
| align=center| 17–7
| David Loiseau
| Decision (unanimous)
| UFC 97
| 
| align=center| 3
| align=center| 5:00
| Montreal, Quebec, Canada
| 
|-
| Loss
| align=center| 16–7
| Alan Belcher
| Decision (split)
| UFC Fight Night: Diaz vs. Neer
| 
| align=center| 3
| align=center| 5:00
| Omaha, Nebraska, United States
| 
|-
| Loss
| align=center| 16–6
| Demian Maia
| Technical Submission (triangle choke)
| UFC 83
| 
| align=center| 2
| align=center| 2:27
| Montreal, Quebec, Canada
| 
|-
| Win
| align=center| 16–5
| Joe Doerksen
| KO (punch)
| UFC 78
| 
| align=center| 3
| align=center| 0:39
| Newark, New Jersey, United States
| 
|-
| Win
| align=center| 15–5
| Scott Smith
| Submission (rear-naked choke)
| UFC 72
| 
| align=center| 2
| align=center| 2:25
| Belfast, Northern Ireland
| 
|-
| Win
| align=center| 14–5
| Chris Price
| Submission (armbar)
| UFC Fight Night: Evans vs. Salmon
| 
| align=center| 1
| align=center| 2:58
| Hollywood, Florida, United States
| 
|-
| Loss
| align=center| 13–5
| Jason MacDonald
| Submission (triangle choke)
| Ortiz vs. Shamrock 3: The Final Chapter
| 
| align=center| 1
| align=center| 2:43
| Hollywood, Florida, United States
| 
|-
| Loss
| align=center| 13–4
| Kendall Grove
| Decision (unanimous)
| The Ultimate Fighter: Team Ortiz vs. Team Shamrock Finale
| 
| align=center| 3
| align=center| 5:00
| Las Vegas, Nevada, United States
| 
|-
| Win
| align=center| 13–3
| Dave Menne
| TKO (corner stoppage)
| Extreme Challenge 63
| 
| align=center| 1
| align=center| 5:00
| Hayward, Wisconsin, United States
| 
|-
| Win
| align=center| 12–3
| Nick Thompson
| TKO (injury)
| Hand 2 Hand Combat
| 
| align=center| 1
| align=center| N/A
| Canton, Ohio, United States
| 
|-
| Win
| align=center| 11–3
| Rhomez Brower
| Submission (armbar)
| IFC: Mayhem in Montana
| 
| align=center| 1
| align=center| 2:47
| Billings, Montana, United States
| 
|-
| Win
| align=center| 10–3
| Glover Teixeira
| Decision (unanimous)
| SF 9: Respect
| 
| align=center| 3
| align=center| 5:00
| Gresham, Oregon, United States
| 
|-
| Loss
| align=center| 9–3
| Joe Doerksen
| Technical Submission (triangle choke)
| SF 7: Frightnight
| 
| align=center| 3
| align=center| 2:12
| Gresham, Oregon, United States
| 
|-
| Win
| align=center| 9–2
| Brian Ebersole
| Submission (triangle choke)
| SF 5: Stadium
| 
| align=center| 2
| align=center| N/A
| Gresham, Oregon, United States
| 
|-
| Loss
| align=center| 8–2
| Kazuo Misaki
| Technical Submission (arm-triangle choke)
| Pancrase: 2004 Neo-Blood Tournament Final
| 
| align=center| 2
| align=center| 3:31
| Tokyo, Japan
| 
|-
| Win
| align=center| 8–1
| Shane Davis
| Submission (armbar)
| SF 4: Fight For Freedom
| 
| align=center| 3
| align=center| N/A
| Gresham, Oregon, United States
| 
|-
| Win
| align=center| 7–1
| Cory Devela
| Submission (armbar)
| Pride and Fury
| 
| align=center| 1
| align=center| 3:20
| Worley, Idaho, United States
| 
|-
| Win
| align=center| 6–1
| Jacen Flynn
| Submission (armbar)
| SF 3: Dome
| 
| align=center| 2
| align=center| 3:48
| Gresham, Oregon, United States
| 
|-
| Win
| align=center| 5–1
| Justin Hawes
| Submission (armbar)
| DesertBrawl 10
| 
| align=center| 2
| align=center| 3:45
| Bend, Oregon, United States
| 
|-
| Win
| align=center| 4–1
| Derek Downey
| TKO (punches)
| SF 1: Revolution
| 
| align=center| 3
| align=center| 2:14
| Portland, Oregon, United States
| 
|-
| Win
| align=center| 3–1
| Rich Guerin
| Submission (americana)
| PPKA: Ultimate Fight Night 3
| 
| align=center| 4
| align=center| 2:17
| Yakima, Washington, United States
| 
|-
| Win
| align=center| 2–1
| Ryan Pope
| Submission (armbar)
| Desert Brawl 9
| 
| align=center| 1
| align=center| 0:24
| Bend, Oregon, United States
| 
|-
| Loss
| align=center| 1–1
| Shane Davis
| Submission (armbar)
| TQP: Sport Fight "Second Coming"
| 
| align=center| 1
| align=center| 2:18
| Gresham, Oregon, United States
| 
|-
| Win
| align=center| 1–0
| Ryan Pope
| Submission (armbar)
| Xtreme Ring Wars 2
| 
| align=center| 1
| align=center| 2:38
| Pasco, Washington, United States
|

See also
 List of current UFC fighters
 List of male mixed martial artists

References

External links 
 
 

Living people
American male mixed martial artists
Mixed martial artists from Washington (state)
Middleweight mixed martial artists
Light heavyweight mixed martial artists
Mixed martial artists utilizing wrestling
Mixed martial artists utilizing Brazilian jiu-jitsu
Sportspeople from Vancouver, Washington
People from Clark County, Washington
1980 births
Ultimate Fighting Championship male fighters
American practitioners of Brazilian jiu-jitsu
People awarded a black belt in Brazilian jiu-jitsu